Twelve Mile is an unincorporated town in Adams Township, Cass County, Indiana. The town was located on the twelve-mile marker of the railroad that the town grew around. The eastern portion of the town was formerly known as Hen Peck; but as the two small towns grew they became one town that was referred to as Twelve Mile.

Festivals
The Twelve Mile Christmas Pageant has been held every December since 1970 in Plank-Hill Park.  The pageant was started by Clifton Skinner, an employee at Bunker Hill Air Force Base (now Grissom Air Reserve Base), who based part of the pageant on a tradition among the base's airmen of placing Christmas-themed panels in front of their barracks.

Twelve Mile is home to the Twelve Mile 500
, a riding lawnmower race held annually on Independence Day and begun in 1963.

References

External links
Cass County: Twelve Mile
Twelve Mile 500 Riding Lawnmower Race

Unincorporated communities in Cass County, Indiana
Unincorporated communities in Indiana